In Greek mythology, Pronous (Ancient Greek: Πρόνοος Pronoos means 'careful, prudent') was the name of the following characters:
 Pronoos, the Locrian son of Deucalion and Pyrrha, the legendary progenitors of the Greek race. He was the brother of Orestheus and Marathonios. In one source, Pronous was named as the father of Hellen. 
Pronous, son of Phegeus, king of Psophis. Along with his brother Agenor he killed Alcmaeon (counted among the Epigoni), following his father's instructions. These brothers were thereafter killed by the sons of Alcmaeon (Amphoterus and Acarnan), or perhaps by their own sister Arsinoe, wife of Alcmaeon. Otherwise, Pausanias calls the two sons of Phegeus, Axion and Temenus.
Pronous, one of the Trojans. He was killed by Patroclus during the Trojan War.
 Pronous, one of the Suitors of Penelope from Ithaca along with 11 other wooers. He, with the other suitors, was killed by Odysseus with the assistance of Eumaeus, Philoetius, and Telemachus.

Notes

References 

 Apollodorus, The Library with an English translation by Sir James George Frazer, F.B.A., F.R.S. in 2 Volumes, Cambridge, MA, Harvard University Press; London, William Heinemann Ltd. 1921. . Online version at the Perseus Digital Library. Greek text available from the same website.
Gantz, Timothy, Early Greek Myth: A Guide to Literary and Artistic Sources, Johns Hopkins University Press, 1996, Two volumes:  (Vol. 1),  (Vol. 2).
Homer, The Iliad with an English Translation by A.T. Murray, Ph.D. in two volumes. Cambridge, MA., Harvard University Press; London, William Heinemann, Ltd. 1924. . Online version at the Perseus Digital Library.
Homer, Homeri Opera in five volumes. Oxford, Oxford University Press. 1920. . Greek text available at the Perseus Digital Library.
 Pausanias, Description of Greece with an English translation by W.H.S. Jones, Litt.D., and H.A. Ormerod, M.A., in 4 Volumes. Cambridge, MA, Harvard University Press; London, William Heinemann Ltd. 1918. . Online version at the Perseus Digital Library
Pausanias, Graeciae Descriptio. 3 vols. Leipzig, Teubner. 1903.  Greek text available at the Perseus Digital Library.
 Sextus Propertius, Elegies from Charm. Vincent Katz. trans. Los Angeles. Sun & Moon Press. 1995. Online version at the Perseus Digital Library. Latin text available at the same website.

Deucalionids
Princes in Greek mythology
Trojans
People of the Trojan War
Suitors of Penelope
Ithacan characters in Greek mythology
Thessalian characters in Greek mythology
Arcadian mythology